Saint Anthony with the Christ Child refers to two paintings by Bartolomé Esteban Murillo, dating to 1665-1666 and 1668-1669 and both now in the Museum of Fine Arts of Seville.

Gallery

References

Paintings by Bartolomé Esteban Murillo
Paintings depicting Jesus
1660s paintings
Paintings of Anthony of Padua
Paintings in the Museum of Fine Arts of Seville